Sunnyside may refer to one of several places in the U.S. state of Oregon:

Sunnyside, Clackamas County, Oregon, a census-designated place 
Sunnyside, Marion County, Oregon, an unincorporated community
Sunnyside, Portland, Oregon, a neighborhood in the city of Portland
Sunnyside, Umatilla County, Oregon, an unincorporated community

See also

 Sunnyside (disambiguation)